Madevan (also Romanized as Mādevān and Mādavān; also known as Mādehvān) is a village in Fasarud Rural District, in the Central District of Darab County, Fars Province, Iran. At the 2006 census, its population was 1,724, in 427 families.

References 

Populated places in Darab County